Associação Ferroviária de Esportes Futebol Feminino, commonly known as Ferroviária or Ferroviária/Fundesport, is a professional women's association football club based in Araraquara, São Paulo state, Brazil. Founded in 2001, they have won the Campeonato Paulista on four occasions. In 2014 they secured a double of the Campeonato Brasileiro and the Copa do Brasil. The club is a three-way collaboration between the Ferroviária men's football club, the local authority's sports and leisure department and the charitable arm of the Caixa bank.

Current squad

Former players
For details of current and former players, see :Category:Associação Ferroviária de Esportes (women) players.

Honours

 Copa Libertadores Femenina
 Winners: 2015, 2020
 Campeonato Brasileiro
 Winners: 2014, 2019
 Copa do Brasil
 Winners: 2014
 Runners-up: 2015
 Campeonato Paulista:
 Winners (4): 2002, 2004, 2005, (as Extra/Fundesport) 2013

References

External links
 

Association football clubs established in 2001
Women's football clubs in Brazil
2001 establishments in Brazil
women